The Ministry of Defence of the Russian Federation (informally abbreviated as МО, МО РФ or Minoboron) is the governing body of the Russian Armed Forces.

The President of Russia is the Commander-in-Chief of the Armed Forces of the Russian Federation and directs the activity of the Ministry. The Minister of Defence exercises day-to-day administrative and operational authority over the armed forces. The General Staff of the Armed Forces executes the president's and the defence minister's instructions and orders.

The main building of the ministry, built in the 1940s, is located on Arbatskaya Square, near Arbat Street. Other buildings of the ministry are located throughout the city of Moscow. The supreme body responsible for the Ministry's management and supervision of the Armed Forces is the National Defense Management Center located on Frunzenskaya Embankment and responsible for the centralization of the Armed Forces' command.

The current Minister of Defence is Army General Sergei Shoigu.

History

The U.S. Library of Congress Country Studies' volume for Russia said in July 1996 that:

In May 1992, President of Russia Boris Yeltsin appointed General of the Army Pavel Grachev to the post of Minister of Defence. Grachev's decision to side with Yeltsin in the Russian constitutional crisis of 1993, when the president called up tanks to shell the Russian White House to blast his opponents out of parliament, effectively deprived the Supreme Soviet of Russia of its nominal an opportunity to overturn the president's authority. At least partly for that reason, Yeltsin retained his defence minister despite intense criticism of Grachev's management of the First Chechen War and the Russian military establishment in general. Finally, Yeltsin's victory in the first round of the 1996 Russian presidential election spurred Yeltsin to dismiss Grachev.

In March 2001, Sergei Ivanov, previously secretary of the Security Council of Russia, was appointed defence minister by President Vladimir Putin, becoming Russia's first non-uniformed civilian defence minister.
Putin called the personnel changes in Russia's security structures coinciding with Ivanov's appointment as defence minister "a step toward demilitarizing public life." Putin also stressed Ivanov's responsibility for overseeing military reform as defence minister. What Putin did not emphasise was Ivanov's long service within the KGB and FSB and his then rank of General-Lieutenant within the FSB. Such military and security agency associated men are known as siloviki.

As of 2002 there were four living Marshals of the Soviet Union. Such men are automatically Advisors to the Defence Minister. The Marshals alive at that time were Viktor Kulikov, Vasily Petrov, Sergei Sokolov, a former Minister of Defence of the Soviet Union, and Dmitri Yazov. Yazov was listed by the American analysts Scott and Scott in 2002 as a consultant to the (former 10th) Directorate for International Military Cooperation.

Perhaps the first 'real' non-uniformed Defence Minister was Anatoliy Serdyukov, appointed in February 2007. Serdyukov was a former Tax Minister with little siloviki or military associations beyond his two years' military service.

Structure
The Ministry of Defence is managed by a collegium chaired by the Defence Minister and including the deputy Defence Ministers, heads of Main Defence Ministry and General Staff Directorates, and the commanders of the Joint Strategic Commands/Military Districts, the three Services, and three branches, who together form the principal staff and advisory board of the Minister of Defence.

The executive body of the Ministry of Defence is the General Staff of the Armed Forces of the Russian Federation. It is commanded by the Chief of General Staff. U.S. expert William Odom said in 1998 that 'the Soviet General Staff without the MoD is conceivable, but the MoD without the General Staff is not.' Russian General Staff officers exercise command authority in their own right. In 1996 the General Staff included fifteen main directorates and an undetermined number of operating agencies. The staff is organized by functions, with each directorate and operating agency overseeing a functional area, generally indicated by the organization's title.

Military Thought is the military-theoretical journal of the Ministry of Defence, and Krasnaya Zvezda its daily newspaper.

Structure in 2021
Senior staff in 2021 included:

Minister of Defence:
 Minister of Defence of the Russian Federation – General of the Army Sergei Shoigu (since 6 November 2012)

First Deputy Minister(s) of Defence:
 Chief of the General Staff of the Armed Forces of the Russian Federation – First Deputy Minister of Defence of the Russian Federation – General of the Army Valery Gerasimov (since 9 November 2012)
 First Deputy Minister of Defence of the Russian Federation – Active State Advisor of the Russian Federation, 1st Class Ruslan Tsalikov (since 24 December 2015)

Deputy Minister(s) of Defence:
 State Secretary – Deputy Minister of Defence of the Russian Federation – General of the Army (Retired) Nikolay Pankov (since 13 September 2005)
 Deputy Minister of Defence of the Russian Federation (Responsible for Organising Material-Technical Support for the Armed Forces) – Colonel General Mikhail Mizintsev (since 24 September 2022) 
 Deputy Minister of Defence of the Russian Federation (Responsible for Organising Financial Support for the Armed Forces) – Active State Advisor of the Russian Federation, 1st Class Tatiana Shevtsova (since 4 August 2010)
 Deputy Minister of Defence of the Russian Federation – Supervisor of the Apparatus of the Ministry of Defence of the Russian Federation – Colonel General Yuriy Sadovenko (since 7 January 2013)
 Deputy Minister of Defence of the Russian Federation (Responsible for the Development of the Technical Basis for the Management System and Information Technology) – General of the Army Pavel Popov (since 7 November 2013)
 Deputy Minister of Defence of the Russian Federation (Responsible for Organising Property Management, Quartering of Troops (Forces), Housing, and Medical Support for the Armed Forces) – Active State Advisor of the Russian Federation, 2nd Class Timur Ivanov (since 23 May 2016)
 Deputy Minister of Defence of the Russian Federation (Responsible for Organising International Military and Military-Technical Cooperation) – Colonel General Alexander Fomin (since 31 January 2017)
 Deputy Minister of Defence of the Russian Federation (Responsible for Organising Military-Technical Support for the Armed Forces) – Active State Councillor of the Russian Federation, 1st Class  (since 13 June 2018)
 Deputy Minister of Defence of the Russian Federation (Responsible for Combat Training) – Colonel General Yunus-Bek Yevkurov (since 8 July 2019)
 Deputy Minister of Defence of the Russian Federation – Chief of the Main Directorate for Political-Military Affairs of the Russian Armed Forces – Colonel General  (since 28 July 2022)

Entities directly subordinated to the Minister of Defence in August 2012 included:

 MOD Press Service and Information Directorate
 MOD Physical Training Directorate
 MOD Financial Auditing Inspectorate
 MOD Main Military Medical Directorate
 MOD State Order Placement Department 
 MOD Property Relations Department
 Expert Center of the MOD Staff
 MOD Administration Directorate
 MOD State Defence Order Facilitation Department
 MOD Department of the State Customer for Capital Construction
 MOD State Architectural-Construction Oversight Department
 MOD Sanatoria-resort Support Department
 MOD Housekeeping Directorate
 MOD State Review/Study Group
 MOD Educational Department
 MOD Legal Department
 MOD Organizational-inspection Department
 MOD Personnel Inspectorate
 MOD Military Inspectorate
 MOD State Technical Oversight Directorate
 MOD Aviation Flight Safety Service
 MOD Nuclear and Radiation Safety Oversight Directorate
 MOD Autotransport Directorate
 MOD Staff Protocol Department
 MOD Armed Force Weapons Turnover Oversight Service
 MOD Main Military Police Directorate

The Office of Inspectors General of the Ministry of Defence was established in 2008, consisting of around thirty retired senior officers. The main task of the office is "to promote the organization of combat and operational training of troops, the construction and further development of the Armed Forces of the Russian Federation, the development of the theory and history of military art, and the education of personnel." It is the successor to the Soviet Armed Forces's Group of Inspectors General, which was dissolved in 1992.

Outline structure 2004
An outline structure of the Ministry of Defence includes the groupings below, but this structure was in transition when it was recorded in 2004, with several deputy minister posts being abolished:

 
Federal Service for Military-Technical Cooperation
Federal Service for the Defence Order
Federal Service for Technical and Export Control
Federal Special Construction Agency of the MOD
11th Directorate of the MOD (function unclear)
12th Main Directorate of the MOD (nuclear weapons)
16th Directorate of the MOD (function unclear)
Hydrometrological Service of the Armed Forces
Military Inspectorate
Directorate of Information and Public Relations
1st Separate Brigade of Protection of the MOD
Archives of the Armed Forces (see also Central Archives of the Russian Ministry of Defence)
State Corporation for Air Traffic Control
Central Theater of the Russian Army
All-Russian Centre for Retraining Officers
General Staff of the Armed Forces of the Russian Federation
directorates, departments, etc.
Russian Ground Forces
Russian Air Force
Russian Navy
Strategic Rocket Forces
Russian Airborne Troops
Russian Aerospace Defence Forces
First Deputy Minister of Defence
Main Directorate for Combat Training of the Armed Forces
Directorate of Force Management and Security of Military Service

Army General Nikolay Pankov, State Secretary – Deputy Min. of Defence
Liaison with Political Power Institutions
[Main] Directorate for Indoctrination [Political Work, Morale]
[Main] Directorate for International Military Cooperation
Directorate for Military Education of the Ministry of Defence
Directorate of Foreign Relations
Directorate of Force Management & Security of Military Service
Directorate of Ecology & Special Means of Protection Min Def RF
Press Service of the Ministry of Defence
Flight Safety Service of Aviation of the Armed Forces RF
Deputy Minister of Defence – Chief of Rear of the Armed Forces
Military medical, trade, transportation, food, clothing, etc.
Deputy Minister of Defence – Chief of Armaments of the Armed Forces
Test ranges, study centres, Military research institutes etc.
GRAU
Main Automotive-Armoured Tank Directorate of the MOD (GABTU)
Autobase of Ministry of Defence
Military Registry
Federal State Unitary Enterprise Rosoboronexport
Military Industrial Council
Deputy Minister of Defence – Chief of Construction and Billeting Service
Main Military Construction Directorate
Main Quarters Exploitation Directorate
other Directorates, departments etc.
Lyubov Kudelina, Deputy Minister of Defence for Financial-Economic Work
Financial-Economic Section of the MOD
Directorate of Military-Economic Analysis and Expertise
Financial Inspectorate of the MOD
Federation of Trade Unions for Civilian Workers of the Armed Forces
Deputy Minister of Defence – Chief of the Main Department of Cadres [personnel]
military schools, military academies, etc.

See also
Awards and emblems of the Ministry of Defence of the Russian Federation

References

External links

  

 
Defence
Defence Minister
Russia
Military of Russia
Defence, Ministry of
Russian and Soviet military-related lists
1717 establishments in Russia